Wellan's is a defunct chain of American department store formerly headquartered in Alexandria, Louisiana.

History

Beginnings
Wellan's Department Store started as a small store on Second Street in Alexandria and was founded by Louis Wellan. It had many items for sale such as dresses, menswear, and some toys and furniture. It coined itself as a new family-oriented store in central Louisiana, and conducted business in just that manner. In 1924, it moved to what would become its landmark location on Third Street. It served the city and region, and became known for its famous Christmas displays in December. For the month of December, the store would decorate its windows and its facade with dazzling lights.

The company then went on an outward expedition and moved into the Alexandria Mall. The company took over Palais Royal stores of Shreveport and acquired both Palais Royal Department Stores and The Depot Stores department stores. The company then established a "modern" store in Monroe, before being purchased by Stage Stores, Inc., in 1997.

The main building was demolished to make way for the Coughlin Saunders Performing Arts Center.

Modern Name Use
Stage Dept. Stores uses the name Palais Royal itself to brand some of its own stores.

References

Defunct retail companies of the United States
Retail companies established in 1904
Defunct companies based in Louisiana
Retail companies disestablished in 1989
1904 establishments in Louisiana
1989 disestablishments in Louisiana